Palpusia goniopalpia is a moth of the family Crambidae. It was described by George Hampson in 1912 and is found in Colombia, but has also been recorded from North America.

The wingspan is about 25 mm.

References

External links

Moths described in 1912
Pyraustinae
Moths of North America